Anastasiia Olegovna Romanova (born 2 October 1991) is a Russian weightlifter, competing in the 69 kg category. She competed at world championships, including at the 2015 World Weightlifting Championships. She won the 2017 European Weightlifting Championships in the 69kg class.

Major results

References

External links
 
 

1991 births
Living people
Russian female weightlifters
Place of birth missing (living people)
European Weightlifting Championships medalists
World Weightlifting Championships medalists
21st-century Russian women